Charles Tracey (May 27, 1847 – March 24, 1905) was a U.S. Representative from New York.

Biography
Born in Albany, New York, Tracey graduated from The Albany Academy in 1866. He served in the Papal Zouaves at Rome, Italy between 1867 and 1870. He was appointed aide-de-camp to Governor Tilden of New York on January 1, 1877. He was appointed manager of the House of Refuge in Hudson, New York, by Governor Cleveland and reappointed by David B. Hill in 1886.
He engaged in the distilling business.

Tracey was elected as a Democrat to the Fiftieth Congress to fill the vacancy caused by the death of Nicholas T. Kane. He was reelected to the Fifty-first, Fifty-second, and Fifty-third Congresses and served from November 8, 1887, to March 3, 1895. He was an unsuccessful candidate for reelection in 1894 to the Fifty-fourth Congress and resumed business activities in Albany and Rochester, New York. He died at Watkins Glen, New York, on March 24, 1905 and was interred in St. Agnes Cemetery, Albany, New York.

Sources

1847 births
1905 deaths
Politicians from Albany, New York
Papal Zouaves
Burials at St. Agnes Cemetery
Democratic Party members of the United States House of Representatives from New York (state)
19th-century American politicians
The Albany Academy alumni